Atalopedes is a genus of skipper butterflies in the family Hesperiidae.

Species
The campestris species group
Atalopedes campestris (Boisduval, 1852)
The mesogramma species group
Atalopedes carteri Evans, 1955
Atalopedes mesogramma (Latreille, [1824])
The clarkei species group
Atalopedes bahiensis (Schaus, 1902)
Atalopedes flaveola (Mabille, 1891)
Group name unassigned/unknown:
Atalopedes lina (Plötz, 1883)

References

External links
Natural History Museum Lepidoptera genus database

Hesperiini
Hesperiidae genera